Metropolitan Park District may refer to:
 Metropolitan Park System of Greater Boston
 Metro Parks Tacoma
 Metro Parks (Columbus, Ohio)
 Metroparks of the Toledo Area